José Mari may refer to:

José Mari (footballer, born 1971), Spanish football midfielder
José Mari (footballer, born 1978), Spanish football forward
José Mari (footballer, born 1985), Spanish football leftback
José Mari (footballer, born 1987), Spanish football defensive midfielder
José Mari Bakero, (born 1963), former Spanish football midfielder
Jose Mari Chan, Philippine singer
Jose Mari Gonzales or José Mari (1938–2019), Filipino actor and politician